TPC Twin Cities is a private golf club in the north central United States, located within the subdivision of Deacon’s Walk in Blaine, Minnesota, a suburb north of Minneapolis.

Opened in 2000, the 18-hole championship golf course was designed by Arnold Palmer in consultation with Tom Lehman; it is a member of the Tournament Players Club network operated by the PGA Tour. Since 2001, it has hosted the 3M Championship on the PGA Tour Champions. On June 18, 2018, it was announced that the 3M Championship would end after 2018, and be replaced by the 3M Open, a PGA Tour event starting in 2019.

Course
Back tees

References

External links

3M Championship – official site

Buildings and structures in Anoka County, Minnesota
Golf clubs and courses in Minnesota
2000 establishments in Minnesota
Sports venues completed in 2000